The "Red Basilica", also called variously the Red Hall and Red Courtyard, is a monumental ruined temple in the ancient city of Pergamon, now Bergama, in western Turkey. The temple was built during the Roman Empire, probably in the time of Hadrian and possibly on his orders. It is one of the largest Roman structures still surviving in the ancient Greek world. The temple is thought to have been used for the worship of Egyptian gods – specifically Isis and/or Serapis, and possibly also Osiris, Harpocrates and other lesser gods, who may have been worshipped in a pair of drum-shaped rotundas, both of which are virtually intact, alongside the main temple.

Although the building itself is of an immense size, it was only one part of a much larger sacred complex, surrounded by high walls, that dwarfed even the colossal Temple of Jupiter in Baalbek. The Pergamon Bridge still stands today, supporting modern buildings and even vehicle traffic. A series of tunnels and chambers lies under the main temple, connecting it with the side rotundas and giving private access to different areas of the complex. Various drains, water channels and basins are located in, around and under the main temple and may have been used for symbolic reenactments of the flooding of the Nile.

The temple was converted by the Romans into a Christian church dedicated to St John but was subsequently destroyed. Today the ruins of the main temple and one of the side rotundas can be visited, while the other side rotunda is still in use as a small mosque.

History 
The temple's date of construction is not recorded, but from the style of the sculptures and the building techniques a date in the first half of the second century AD has been proposed. Its use of red brick on a massive scale, unique in Asia Minor but relatively common in Italy at the time, indicates that the architect was not local. The immense size and lavish construction of the complex points to an extremely wealthy patron who sent a Roman architect and brick masons to Pergamon to build the temple. The most likely candidate is the emperor Hadrian himself. He is known to have been an enthusiastic sponsor of the Egyptian gods; he built temples of Isis and Serapis at various places in the Roman world, including at his own villa in Tivoli.

At some point during the Christian era the temple was gutted by fire. It was not restored, but was redeveloped in the 5th century AD as a Christian basilica, built inside the shell of the destroyed temple. Arcades were built dividing the interior into a central nave and two side aisles. The eastern wall was demolished and replaced with an apse. The church was probably destroyed by the forces of the Arab general Maslamah ibn Abd al-Malik, who besieged and looted the city in 716–717 during his unsuccessful bid to conquer Constantinople. Pergamon fell into Turkish hands in 1336 and the building was converted into a mosque.

The complex has been investigated and excavated in a series of campaigns by the German Archaeological Institute. In 1906–1909 P. Schazmann prepared detailed drawings of the ruins during a German excavation of the Hellenistic city. New archaeological studies were carried out from 2002 to 2005 under A. Hoffmann. Restoration efforts have also been pursued, first in the 1930s under O. Bayatlı, the Director of the Bergama Museum, and later in the 1950s and 1960s. Further restoration work was conducted on the main temple in 2006 and the south rotunda was restored between 2006 and 2009.

Description

The temple was built in the lower city of Pergamon at the foot of the hill on which the ancient city's acropolis stood. The main entrance lay on the western side of the  through a colossal marble gateway; smaller gateways were located on the same side, north and south of the main gate.

The  was built on top of the River Selinus, presumably because the person who commissioned the complex wished it to be located in the city centre rather than in an outlying district. As the city was already substantially built up, the river bed offered an otherwise unused location for the temple complex and reduced the number of properties that would have to be demolished to make way for it. This structure, the Pergamon Bridge, still stands today and continues to drain the river underneath the complex.

The temple

The building was originally a vast hall, rather than a basilica, covered by a wooden roof that had no interior support or colonnade. Its walls were built entirely of red bricks that gave the building its modern Turkish name (which means literally "Red Courtyard"). They were covered in marble in various colours, though this has entirely disappeared; some important structural parts were also constructed from marble.

There appear to have been windows only in the western half of the main temple, meaning that the eastern half did not receive any natural light (unless there were windows in the eastern wall, which no longer stands). Its door-sill is still in place and was made from a single piece of marble weighing over 30 tons. It seems, however, that the door was kept open continuously as there are no traces of the rollers that would have been necessary to open and close it. In front of the door stood an iron grating, which presumably had an opening in it to permit access to the interior of the temple.

A total of twelve arched niches are embedded in the walls of the western end of the temple, five each lining the north and south walls and another two flanking the door on the west wall. In his novel Metamorphoses, the Roman writer Apuleius described a visit to the temple in which his protagonist "saw the gods infernal and the gods celestial, before whom I presented myself and worshipped." It had no inflow pipe or drain. The floor of the temple was constructed from plates of marble and granite imported from as far away as Egypt.

The eastern end of the hall would have been closed to the public and could only be accessed by the temple priests and their attendants. An entry-hole in the base indicates that priests could climb inside the body of the statue, perhaps to make it "speak" during ceremonies.

The original wall no longer exists but from the foundations it can be seen that it would have been in the shape of an inverted semicircle. During the Christian era it was demolished and replaced with an apsidal wall.

Side courts and rotundas

Two rotundas topped by domes stand on either side of the main temple. Although they have been stripped of their original marble cladding, they are still substantially intact. The two rotundas had different fates in the modern era. The one on the south side, which is part of the Red Basilica archaeological site and is open to visitors, was re-used and modified in the Ottoman period, and in the 19th century became the machinery room for an olive oil factory. Its inside walls are still covered with black soot from the smoke produced by the machinery. The north rotunda is currently used as a mosque.

The two rotundas stood within courtyards to the north and south of the main temple. The figures were clearly intended to represent Egyptians, as they are depicted wearing Egyptian headgear.

These basins each had a smaller round basin of  diameter at each end.

Underground
An underground complex lies below the temple and rotundas. Spiral ramps lead down from the rotundas to connect with a north-south passageway that links all three buildings. The passageways gave access to the hidden entrance to the cult statue and also to the side walls of the temple, linking to shafts that connected with the temple roof.

They appear to have been generally unadorned, but some pieces of coloured stucco are reported to be visible in one area – perhaps the remainder of some kind of decoration. The chambers to which they link are substantial structures. The two excavated chambers beside the south rotunda are today used as storage space for the archaeological site.

Use and purpose

The temple was certainly used to worship Egyptian gods, as the presence of Egyptianised atlantids indicates. Which specific gods were worshipped there is, however, unclear. An inscription referring to the temple mentions "Serapis, Isis, Harpocrates, Osiris, Apis, Helios on a horse ... Ares and the Dioskouroi". The temple may well have been dedicated to Isis, though some historians have interpreted it as a Serapeum (temple of Serapis) instead. The two rotundas may have been used for the worship of Horus and Anubis.

The layout of the temple provides more clues about how it was used. Unlike Greek temples, where the entire building was considered to be the house of the divinity, the god worshipped in the "Red Basilica" was confined to the eastern half of the temple. Similar layouts are found in other Isis and Serapis temples elsewhere in Asia Minor and Greece. The  is a vastly enlarged equivalent of enclosures found elsewhere in Greek mystery sanctuaries, such as the one as Eleusis in Greece where the Eleusinian Mysteries were performed annually.

Water appears to have been a central theme of the ceremonies held at the temple, judging from the number of water features (basins, troughs and so on) in the complex. The basins outside the temple may have been purely decorative but those inside seem to have been intended for use in ceremonies. These may have included purification rituals – sprinkling the faithful with water – and possibly also a ritual re-enactment of the flooding of the Nile. Robert A. Wild suggests that the deep basin dividing the temple into its eastern and western halves may have been designed to convey flood- or rainwater into the temple during peak rainfall periods in the winter. The basin also served to separate the public western half of the temple from the sacred eastern half. Initiates may have been taken through the underground passages to the cultic area, where they would be presented to the worshippers filling the western end of the temple. Something of this nature is hinted at by Apuleius in Metamorphoses: "There in the middle of this sacred temple before the image of the goddess I was made to stand on a wooden pulpit."

References

Bibliography

 
 
 
 
 
 
 
 

2nd-century religious buildings and structures
2nd-century establishments in the Roman Empire
1906 archaeological discoveries
Ancient Roman buildings and structures in Turkey
Ancient Roman temples
Archaeological sites in the Aegean Region
Pergamon
Conversion of non-Christian religious buildings and structures into churches
Asia (Roman province)
Temples of Isis
Hadrianic building projects
Serapis